Michael Musyoki (born May 28, 1956) is a retired long-distance runner from Kenya. He won the bronze medal in 10,000 metres at the 1984 Summer Olympics.

Running career

Collegiate
Musyoki was recruited by University of Texas at El Paso, a school which was building a star-studded team of distance-runners in the late 1970s. Suleiman Nyambui and Musyoki were UTEP's two premier foreign distance-runner recruits at the time, and finished in first and second place respectively in the 10,000 metre race at the 1979 NCAA Outdoor Track Championships.

Post-collegiate
At the 1978 Commonwealth Games Musyoki was the silver medalist behind compatriot Henry Rono. At the 1978 All-Africa Games, Musyoki was the silver medalist in both the 5000m and 10000m. In 1982 he broke the half marathon world record by running 61:36 in Philadelphia. He was also an active road racer and won "Road Racer of the Year" award in 1983 given by Running Times.

Musyoki won bronze in the 10,000 metres at the 1984 Summer Olympics, finishing third in an extremely close finish. Musyoki was only 0.24 seconds behind silver medalist Mike McLeod of Great Britain and just four-hundredths of a second in front of Salvatore Antibo of Italy.

References 

1956 births
Living people
Kenyan male long-distance runners
Olympic athletes of Kenya
Athletes (track and field) at the 1984 Summer Olympics
Olympic bronze medalists for Kenya
Athletes (track and field) at the 1978 Commonwealth Games
World record setters in athletics (track and field)
University of Texas at El Paso alumni
UTEP Miners men's track and field athletes
Commonwealth Games medallists in athletics
Medalists at the 1984 Summer Olympics
Olympic bronze medalists in athletics (track and field)
Commonwealth Games silver medallists for Kenya
African Games silver medalists for Kenya
African Games medalists in athletics (track and field)
Athletes (track and field) at the 1978 All-Africa Games
Medallists at the 1978 Commonwealth Games